HS4 may refer to:

A postcode in the HS postcode area in the  Outer Hebrides, Scotland, UK
HS4Air, a proposed high-speed railway in southern England, UK
HS-4, a former designation of the HSC-4 helicopter squadron of the United States Navy